Tazeh Kand-e Hurilar (also Romanized as Tāzeh Kand-e Ḩūrīlar and Tāzehkand-e Ḩowreylar; also known as Tāzeh Kand-e Khowreylar and Tāzeh Kand-e Khvorīlar) is a village in Leylan-e Shomali Rural District, Leylan District, Malekan County, East Azerbaijan Province, Iran. At the 2006 census, its population was 392, in 91 families.

References 

Populated places in Malekan County